Furlanis is a surname of Italian descent.

Meaning
The meaning of this surname is one who lived in the region of Friuli, which is located in northern Italy.

Coat of arms
The Furlanis coat of arms is a silver shield with three blue chevrons and there is no motto available.

References

External links
Coat of Arms

Surnames